

Practice Monday 20 August – Saturday 26 August 2007

Senior Manx Grand Prix Leaderboard and Practice Times

Race results

Newcomers Race A
Monday 27 August 2007 – Mountain Course  4 laps – 150.92 miles (242.80 km)
 Four-stroke Four-cylinder motorcycles exceeding 550 cc and not exceeding 750 cc.
 Twin/three-cylinder motorcycles exceeding 601 cc and not exceeding 1000 cc.

Fastest Lap No 6. Andrew Brady – 19 minutes 22.85 seconds  116.806 mph

Newcomers Race C
Monday 27 August 2007 – Mountain Course 4 laps – 150.92 miles (242.80 km)
 Two-stroke motorcycles exceeding 125 cc and 6 gears.
 Four-stroke motorcycles exceeding 251 cc and not exceeding 400 cc.

Fastest Lap No 48 Oliver Linsdell – 21 minutes 25.12 seconds  105.693 mph

Senior Classic Race
Monday 27 August 2007 – Mountain Course 4 laps – 150.92 miles (242.80 km)
 For motorcycles exceeding 350 cc and not exceeding 500 cc.

Fastest Lap No 6. Ryan Farquhar – 20 minutes 52.47 seconds  108.448 mph

Junior Classic Race
Wednesday 29 August 2007 – Mountain Course 4 laps – 150.92 miles (242.80 km)
 Class A for motorcycles exceeding 300 cc and not exceeding 350 cc.

Fastest Lap No 10. Roy Richardson – 22 minutes 01.37 seconds  102.794 mph

Lightweight Classic Race
Wednesday 29 August 2007 – Mountain Course 4 laps – 150.92 miles (242.80 km)
 Class B for motorcycles exceeding 175 cc and not exceeding 250 cc.

Fastest Lap No 75. Ewan Hamilton – 23 minutes 37.47 seconds  95.825 mph

Junior Manx Grand Prix
Wednesday 29 August 2007 – Mountain Course 4 laps – 150.92 miles (242.80 km)
 Two-stroke motorcycles exceeding 200 cc and not exceeding 350 cc.
 Four-stroke four-cylinder motorcycles exceeding 450 cc and not exceeding 600 cc.
 Four-stroke twin-cylinder motorcycles exceeding 600 cc and not exceeding 750 cc.

Lightweight Manx Grand Prix
Friday 31 August 2007 – Mountain Course 4 laps – 150.92 miles (242.80 km)
 Two-stroke motorcycles 201 cc – 350 cc 

Fastest Lap No 7. Samuel Dunlop – 20 minutes 36.15 seconds  109.880 mph

Ultra-Lightweight Manx Grand Prix (Provisional Result)
Friday 31 August 2007 – Mountain Course 3 laps – 113.00 miles
 Two-stroke motorcycles upt 125 cc, 6 gears maximum.
 Four-stroke motorcycles 251 cc – 401 cc

Ultra-Lightweight Manx Grand Prix (Revised Result)
Friday 31 August 2007 – Mountain Course 4 laps – 150.92 miles (242.80 km) 

Fastest Lap No 41. Oliver Linsdell – 20 minutes 47.03 seconds  108.922 mph.

Notes
  After the cancellation of the first  evening practice session on Saturday 18 August 2007 due to heavy rain and low-lying mist on the primary A18 Mountain Road section of the Snaefell mountain course The next Manx Grand Prix practice was held on the evening of Monday 20 August 2007 with the newcomers escorted on their first lap by travelling marshalls and former Isle of Man TT Race competitors.  A number of competitors where caught-out at Governor's Bridge including newcomer Dave Yeomans and also John Harrison riding a 600 cc Honda and John Batty on a 400c Kawasaki.  Former 1972 Manx Grand Prix Senior winner Dave Hughes injured an arm after a crash at Union Mills riding a 350 cc Manx Norton.  At Cruickshank's Corner in Ramsey, Steve Gibbs slipped of his 350 cc Classic Honda and was uninjured.
  During Tuesday evening practice Brian Spooner set the fastest time in the Lightweight class with a lap at an average speed of 111.288 mph and then suffered a crash at Quarterbridge as did  Neil Kent at Ballacraine and both were uninjured.
 Wednesday Evening practice is cut-short after problems with low-lying sea-mist and fog in the Kirk Michael area.  Only two laps of practice are completed by the Senior, Junior and Lightweight competitors.  An incident involving two riders occurred at the Waterworks Corner near Ramsey between Marie Hodson and Robert Gordon. Another incident occurred at Alpine Cottage with Kevin Fitzpatrick and Neil Cudworth taken to Nobles Hospital with suspected minor fractures.
 Again Thursday evening practice is cut-short by reduced visibility on the Mountain Section of the course and sea-mist in the Kirk Michael area.

Sources

External links
 Detailed race results
 Mountain Course map

2006
2007 in British motorsport
Manx
Manx